Curtis George Norval Olson (March 26, 1908 – October 15, 2004) was a North Dakota public servant and politician with the Republican Party who served as the North Dakota State Auditor from 1957 to 1972. Prior to serving as Auditor, he was in the North Dakota House of Representatives from 1941 to 1946. His death at the age of 96 in 2004 made him the second longest-lived statewide official ever to serve the state, behind Robert S. Lewis.

Notes

1908 births
2004 deaths
North Dakota State Auditors
Members of the North Dakota House of Representatives
20th-century American politicians